Pennsylvania Route 418 (PA 418) is a  state highway located in Mercer County, Pennsylvania.  The southern terminus is at PA 760/PA 718 in Wheatland.  The northern terminus is at US 62 in Hermitage.

Route description

PA 418 begins at an intersection with PA 718 and PA 760 in the borough of Wheatland, heading north on two-lane undivided Council Street. The route passes through residential areas, turning northeast onto Mercer Avenue and heading into the city of Farrell. The road passes more homes and reaches an intersection with PA 518. A short distance after this junction, PA 418 enters the city of Hermitage and heads into more wooded areas with a few residences. The route turns north onto Maple Drive and reaches its northern terminus at US 62.

Major intersections

See also

References

External links

Pennsylvania Highways: PA 418

418